The Rangemaster is a series of bolt-action rifles produced by the British company RPA International, formerly known as RPA Precision Ltd. Before the Rangemaster, the company had focused on target rifles, and entered the tactical rifle market in 2001 when they introduced their Rangemaster 7.62 rifle in 7.62×51mm NATO. Rangemaster soon subsequently developed other versions, with both the Rangemaster 338 in .338 Lapua Magnum and the subsonic short range Rangemaster 7.62 Standby in 7.62 NATO introduced in 2004, and the long range Rangemaster .50 anti-materiel rifle in 12.7 × 99mm NATO released the following year in 2005.

Overview

According to the company Rangemaster rifles are in active use with a substantial number of law enforcement personnel across the world and with appropriate ammunition are capable of performing constant sub-MOA accuracy (0.3 mrad).

See also 
 Accuracy International Arctic Warfare
 SIG Sauer SSG 3000
 C12A1, rifle based on the RPA Quadlock also produced by RPA International

References

External links 
 RPA Rangemaster .50 - Modern Firearms
 Hands-on Review: RPA Rangemaster A big European .50 BMG sniper rifle, and a nice one at that! By Melvin Ewing October 24, 2014

Bolt-action rifles of the United Kingdom
Sniper rifles of the United Kingdom
.50 BMG sniper rifles
7.62×51mm NATO rifles